In topology, a branch of mathematics, and specifically knot theory, the lamp cord trick is an observation that two certain spaces are homeomorphic, even if one of the components is knotted. The name comes from R. H. Bing's book "The Geometric Topology of 3-manifolds".

References 

Lucien Grillet, La Conjecture de Smith en faible régularité.

Knot theory